William Gordon, 2nd Earl of Aberdeen (1679 – 30 March 1745), known between c. 1691 and 1720 as Lord Haddo, was a Scottish landowner and Tory politician who sat in the British House of Commons briefly from 1708 to 1709 when he was declared ineligible, being the eldest son of a Scottish peer. He showed some Jacobite sympathies, but took no part in the rebellions.

Early life
Gordon was baptized on 22 December 1679, the fourth but eldest surviving son of the George Gordon, 1st Earl of Aberdeen, and hs wife Anne Lockhart, daughter of George Lockhart of Torbreck, Sutherland. After the death of his elder brother in 1691, he acquired the courtesy title of Lord Haddo.  By about 1705, he had married Lady Mary Melville, the only daughter of the 5th Earl of Leven.

Career
Lord Haddo became a member of the Scottish Privy Council in 1704. After the Acts of Union 1707, the position of Privy councillor was abolished, but he was returned as Member of Parliament for Aberdeenshire at the 1708 British general election. As the eldest son of a peer, however, he was declared ineligible and was replaced by Sir Alexander Cumming, 1st Baronet a year later. His wife Mary died in 1710 giving birth to their second child. After the change of administration in 1710, he applied for a place and was granted an unpaid role as a Scottish Commissioner of chamberlainry and trade in 1711. He lost the post on the Hanoverian succession in 1714. AT the 1715 Jacobite rebellion he retired to Edinburgh and took no part. 
 
In about 1716, Lord Haddo married, as his second wife, Lady Susan Murray, daughter of the 1st Duke of Atholl. In 1718 he was Commissioner for visitation at St Andrews University. He succeeded to his father's titles as Earl of Aberdeen in 1720. In 1721, he was chosen as a representative peer for the House of Lords. His second wife also died giving birth to their last child and later he married Lady Anne Gordon, daughter of the 2nd Duke of Gordon. In 1732 he completed Haddo House, near Tarves in Aberdeenshire which was designed by William Adam.

Death and legacy
Lord Aberdeen died at Edinburgh on 30 March 1745. He had acquired the estates of Ballogie, Boddam, Crichie, Fedderat, Fyvie, Ruthven and Tarland.  He was succeeded by his eldest son, George. His family took no part in the Jacobite rising.

By his first wife Mary, he had two daughters,
 Lady Anne Gordon (1709–1755, married the 5th Earl of Dumfries), and
 Lady Mary Gordon (born and died 1710).
By his second wife Susan he had four children,
George Gordon, 3rd Earl of Aberdeen (1722–1801),
John Gordon (died 1727),
Lady Catherine Gordon (1718–10 December 1779), married her distant cousin, the 3rd Duke of Gordon, and then married Staats Long Morris), and
Lady Susan Gordon (d. 1725).
By his third wife Anne, he had six children,
Gen. William Gordon, (died 25 May 1816), Member of Parliament for Woodstock 1767 and for Heytesbury 1774, a Groom of the Bedchamber 1775,
 Col. Cosmo Gordon (d. after 1783)
 Alexander Gordon, Lord Rockville (1739–1792)
 Capt. Charles Gordon (d. 13 December 1771)
 Lady Harriet Gordon, married as his second wife Robert Gordon, 15th of Hallhead on 2 March 1760, and had issue
 Lady Elizabeth Gordon (born 28 October 1734)

References

External links

1679 births
1746 deaths
British MPs 1708–1710
02
Haddo, William Gordon, Lord
Scottish representative peers
Scottish Tory MPs (pre-1912)
Scottish Jacobites
Members of the Privy Council of Scotland